Mirko Koršič (born 18 January 1914, date of death unknown) was a Yugoslav fencer. He competed in the individual and team foil events at the 1936 Summer Olympics.

References

External links
 

1914 births
Year of death missing
Yugoslav male foil fencers
Olympic fencers of Yugoslavia
Fencers at the 1936 Summer Olympics
Sportspeople from Ljubljana
Slovenian male foil fencers
Carniolan people